Theodore John Kaczynski (born May 22, 1942), also known as the Unabomber, is an American domestic terrorist and former mathematics professor.  He was a mathematics prodigy, but abandoned his academic career in 1969 to pursue a more primitive life. Between 1978 and 1995, Kaczynski killed three people and injured 23 others in a nationwide mail bombing campaign against people he believed to be advancing modern technology and the destruction of the environment. He authored Industrial Society and Its Future, a 35,000-word manifesto and social critique opposing industrialization, rejecting leftism, and advocating for a nature-centered form of anarchism.

In 1971, Kaczynski moved to a remote cabin without electricity or running water near Lincoln, Montana, where he lived as a recluse while learning survival skills to become self-sufficient. After witnessing the destruction of the wilderness surrounding his cabin, he concluded that living in nature was becoming impossible and resolved to fight industrialization and its destruction of nature through terrorism. In 1979, Kaczynski became the subject of what was, by the time of his arrest, the longest and most expensive investigation in the history of the Federal Bureau of Investigation (FBI). The FBI used the case identifier UNABOM (University and Airline Bomber) before his identity was known, resulting in the media naming him the "Unabomber".

In 1995, Kaczynski sent a letter to The New York Times promising to "desist from terrorism" if the Times or The Washington Post published his manifesto, in which he argued that his bombings were extreme but necessary in attracting attention to the erosion of human freedom and dignity by modern technologies that require mass organization. The FBI and Attorney General Janet Reno pushed for the publication of the essay, which appeared in The Washington Post in September 1995. Upon reading it, Kaczynski's brother, David, recognized the prose style and reported his suspicions to the FBI. Kaczynski was arrested in 1996, and—maintaining that he was sane—tried and failed to dismiss his court-appointed lawyers because they wanted him to plead insanity to avoid the death penalty. He pleaded guilty to all charges in 1998 and was sentenced to eight consecutive life terms in prison without the possibility of parole.

Early life

Childhood 

Theodore John Kaczynski was born in Chicago on May 22, 1942, to working-class parents Wanda Theresa (née Dombek) and Theodore Richard Kaczynski, a sausage maker. The two were Polish Americans who were raised as Catholics but later became atheists. They married on April 11, 1939.

From first to fourth grade (ages six to nine), Kaczynski attended Sherman Elementary School in Chicago, where administrators described him as healthy and well-adjusted. In 1952, three years after David was born, the family moved to suburban Evergreen Park, Illinois, and Ted transferred to Evergreen Park Central Junior High School. After testing scored his IQ at 167, he skipped the sixth grade. Kaczynski later described this as a pivotal event: previously he had socialized with his peers and was even a leader, but after skipping ahead of them he felt he did not fit in with the older children, who bullied him.

Neighbors in Evergreen Park later described the Kaczynski family as "civic-minded folks," one recalling the parents "sacrificed everything they had for their children." Both Ted and David were intelligent, but Ted exceptionally so. Neighbors described him as a smart but lonely individual.

High school 

Kaczynski attended Evergreen Park Community High School, where he excelled academically. He played the trombone in the marching band and was a member of the mathematics, biology, coin, and German clubs. In 1996, a former classmate said: "He was never really seen as a person, as an individual personality... He was always regarded as a walking brain, so to speak." During this period, Kaczynski became intensely interested in mathematics, spending hours studying and solving advanced problems. He became associated with a group of like-minded boys interested in science and mathematics, known as the "briefcase boys" for their habit of carrying briefcases.

Throughout high school, Kaczynski was ahead of his classmates academically. Placed in a more advanced mathematics class, he soon mastered the material. He skipped the eleventh grade, and by attending summer school, he graduated at age 15. Kaczynski was one of his school's five National Merit finalists and was encouraged to apply to Harvard. While still at age 15, he was accepted to Harvard and entered the university on a scholarship in 1958 at age 16. A classmate later said Kaczynski was emotionally unprepared: "They packed him up and sent him to Harvard before he was ready... He didn't even have a driver's license."

Harvard University 

During his first year at Harvard, Kaczynski lived at 8 Prescott Street, which was designed to accommodate the youngest, most precocious incoming students in a small, intimate living space. For the following three years, he lived at Eliot House. Housemates and other students at Harvard described Kaczynski as a very intelligent but socially reserved person. Kaczynski earned his Bachelor of Arts degree in mathematics from Harvard in 1962, finishing with a GPA of 3.12.

Psychological study 
In his second year at Harvard, Kaczynski participated in a study described by author Alston Chase as a "purposely brutalizing psychological experiment" led by Harvard psychologist Henry Murray. Subjects were told they would debate personal philosophy with a fellow student and were asked to write essays detailing their personal beliefs and aspirations. The essays were given to an anonymous individual who would confront and belittle the subject in what Murray himself called "vehement, sweeping, and personally abusive" attacks, using the content of the essays as ammunition. Electrodes monitored the subject's physiological reactions. These encounters were filmed, and subjects' expressions of anger and rage were later played back to them repeatedly. The experiment lasted three years, with someone verbally abusing and humiliating Kaczynski each week. Kaczynski spent 200 hours as part of the study.

Kaczynski's lawyers later attributed his hostility towards mind control techniques to his participation in Murray's study. Some sources have suggested that Murray's experiments were part of Project MKUltra, the Central Intelligence Agency's research into mind control. Chase and others have also suggested that this experience may have motivated Kaczynski's criminal activities. Kaczynski stated he resented Murray and his co-workers, primarily because of the invasion of his privacy he perceived as a result of their experiments. Nevertheless, he said he was "quite confident that [his] experiences with Professor Murray had no significant effect on the course of [his] life."

Mathematics career 

In 1962, Kaczynski enrolled at the University of Michigan, where he earned his master's and doctoral degrees in mathematics in 1964 and 1967, respectively. Michigan was not his first choice for postgraduate education; he had applied to the University of California, Berkeley, and the University of Chicago, both of which accepted him but offered him no teaching position or financial aid. Michigan offered him an annual grant of $2,310 and a teaching post.

At Michigan, Kaczynski specialized in complex analysis, specifically geometric function theory. Professor Peter Duren said of Kaczynski, "He was an unusual person. He was not like the other graduate students. He was much more focused about his work. He had a drive to discover mathematical truth." George Piranian, another of his Michigan mathematics professors, said, "It is not enough to say he was smart." Professor Allen Shields wrote about Kaczynski in a grade evaluation that he was the "best man I have seen." Kaczynski received 1 F, 5 Bs and 12 As in his 18 courses at the university. In 2006, he said he had unpleasant memories of Michigan and felt the university had low standards for grading, as evidenced by his relatively high grades.

For a period of several weeks in 1966, Kaczynski experienced intense sexual fantasies of being female and decided to undergo gender transition. He arranged to meet with a psychiatrist, but changed his mind in the waiting room and did not disclose his reason for making the appointment. Afterwards, enraged, he considered killing the psychiatrist and other people whom he hated. Kaczynski described this episode as a "major turning point" in his life: "I felt disgusted about what my uncontrolled sexual cravings had almost led me to do. And I felt humiliated, and I violently hated the psychiatrist. Just then there came a major turning point in my life. Like a Phoenix, I burst from the ashes of my despair to a glorious new hope."

In 1967, Kaczynski's dissertation Boundary Functions won the Sumner B. Myers Prize for Michigan's best mathematics dissertation of the year. Allen Shields, his doctoral advisor, called it "the best I have ever directed," and Maxwell Reade, a member of his dissertation committee, said, "I would guess that maybe 10 or 12 men in the country understood or appreciated it."

In late 1967, the 25-year-old Kaczynski became an acting assistant professor at the University of California, Berkeley, where he taught mathematics. By September 1968, Kaczynski was appointed assistant professor, a sign that he was on track for tenure. His teaching evaluations suggest he was not well-liked by his students: he seemed uncomfortable teaching, taught straight from the textbook and refused to answer questions. Without any explanation, Kaczynski resigned on June 30, 1969. In a 1970 letter directed to Kaczynski's thesis advisor Allen Shields, written by the chairman of the mathematics department, John W. Addison Jr, the professor referred to the resignation as "quite out of the blue," and, markedly, added that "Kaczynski seemed almost pathologically shy," and that as far as he knew Kaczynski made no close friends in the department, furthermore noting that efforts to bring him more into the 'swing of things' had failed.

Life in Montana 

After resigning from Berkeley, Kaczynski moved to his parents' home in Lombard, Illinois. Two years later, in 1971, he moved to a remote cabin he had built outside Lincoln, Montana, where he could live a simple life with little money and without electricity or running water, working odd jobs and receiving significant financial support from his family.

Kaczynski's original goal was to become self-sufficient so he could live autonomously. He used an old bicycle to get to town, and a volunteer at the local library said he visited frequently to read classic works in their original languages. Other Lincoln residents said later that such a lifestyle was not unusual in the area. Kaczynski's cabin was described by a census taker in the 1990 census as containing a bed, two chairs, storage trunks, a gas stove, and lots of books.

Starting in 1975, Kaczynski performed acts of sabotage including arson and booby trapping against developments near to his cabin. He also dedicated himself to reading about sociology and political philosophy, including the works of Jacques Ellul. Kaczynski's brother David later stated that Ellul's book The Technological Society "became Ted's Bible". Kaczynski recounted in 1998, "When I read the book for the first time, I was delighted, because I thought, 'Here is someone who is saying what I have already been thinking.'"

In an interview after his arrest, Kaczynski recalled being shocked on a hike to one of his favorite wild spots:

Kaczynski was visited multiple times in Montana by his father, who was impressed by Ted's wilderness skills. Kaczynski's father was diagnosed with terminal lung cancer in 1990 and held a family meeting without Kaczynski later that year to map out their future. On October 2, 1990, Kaczynski's father committed suicide by shooting himself in his home.

Bombings 
Between 1978 and 1995, Kaczynski mailed or hand-delivered a series of increasingly sophisticated bombs that cumulatively killed three people and injured 23 others. Sixteen bombs were attributed to Kaczynski. While the bombing devices varied widely through the years, many contained the initials "FC", which Kaczynski later said stood for "Freedom Club", inscribed on parts inside. He purposely left misleading clues in the devices and took extreme care in preparing them to avoid leaving fingerprints; fingerprints found on some of the devices did not match those found on letters attributed to Kaczynski.

Initial bombings 
Kaczynski's first mail bomb was directed at Buckley Crist, a professor of materials engineering at Northwestern University. On May 25, 1978, a package bearing Crist's return address was found in a parking lot at the University of Illinois at Chicago. The package was "returned" to Crist, who was suspicious because he had not sent it, so he contacted campus police. Officer Terry Marker opened the package, which exploded and caused minor injuries. Kaczynski had returned to Chicago for the May 1978 bombing and stayed there for a time to work with his father and brother at a foam rubber factory. In August 1978, his brother fired him for writing insulting limericks about a female supervisor Ted had courted briefly. The supervisor later recalled Kaczynski as intelligent and quiet, but remembered little of their acquaintanceship and firmly denied they had had any romantic relationship. Kaczynski's second bomb was sent nearly one year after the first one, again to Northwestern University. The bomb, concealed inside a cigar box and left on a table, caused minor injuries to graduate student John Harris when he opened it.

FBI involvement 
In 1979, a bomb was placed in the cargo hold of American Airlines Flight 444, a Boeing 727 flying from Chicago to Washington, D.C. A faulty timing mechanism prevented the bomb from exploding, but it released smoke, which caused the pilots to carry out an emergency landing. Authorities said it had enough power to "obliterate the plane" had it exploded. Kaczynski sent his next bomb to the president of United Airlines, Percy Wood. Wood received cuts and burns over most of his body.

Kaczynski left false clues in most bombs, which he intentionally made hard to find to make them appear more legitimate. Clues included metal plates stamped with the initials "FC" hidden somewhere (usually in the pipe end cap) in bombs, a note left in a bomb that did not detonate reading "Wu—It works! I told you it would—RV," and the Eugene O'Neill one-dollar stamps often used as postage on his boxes. He sent one bomb embedded in a copy of Sloan Wilson's novel Ice Brothers. The FBI theorized that Kaczynski's crimes involved a theme of nature, trees and wood. He often included bits of a tree branch and bark in his bombs; his selected targets included Percy Wood and Professor Leroy Wood. The crime writer Robert Graysmith noted his "obsession with wood" was "a large factor" in the bombings.

Later bombings 

In 1981, a package bearing the return address of a Brigham Young University professor of electrical engineering, LeRoy Wood Bearnson, was discovered in a hallway at the University of Utah. It was brought to the campus police, and was defused by a bomb squad. In May of the following year, a bomb was sent to Patrick C. Fischer, a professor of computer science at Vanderbilt University. Fischer was on vacation in Puerto Rico at the time; his secretary, Janet Smith, opened the bomb and received injuries to her face and arms.

Kaczynski's next two bombs targeted people at the University of California, Berkeley. The first, in July 1982, caused serious injuries to engineering professor Diogenes Angelakos. Nearly three years later, in May 1985, John Hauser, a graduate student and captain in the United States Air Force, lost four fingers and the vision in one eye. Kaczynski handcrafted the bomb from wooden parts. A bomb sent to the Boeing Company in Auburn, Washington, was defused by a bomb squad the following month. In November 1985, professor James V. McConnell and research assistant Nicklaus Suino were both severely injured after Suino opened a mail bomb addressed to McConnell.

In late 1985, a nail-and-splinter-loaded bomb placed in the parking lot of his store in Sacramento, California, killed 38-year-old computer store owner Hugh Scrutton. A similar attack against a computer store took place in Salt Lake City, Utah, on February 20, 1987. The bomb, disguised as a piece of lumber, injured Gary Wright when he attempted to remove it from the store's parking lot. The explosion severed nerves in Wright's left arm and propelled over 200 pieces of shrapnel into his body. Kaczynski was spotted while planting the Salt Lake City bomb. This led to a widely distributed sketch of the suspect as a hooded man with a mustache and aviator sunglasses.

In 1993, after a six-year break, Kaczynski mailed a bomb to the home of Charles Epstein from the University of California, San Francisco. Epstein lost several fingers upon opening the package. In the same weekend, Kaczynski mailed a bomb to David Gelernter, a computer science professor at Yale University. Gelernter lost sight in one eye, hearing in one ear, and a portion of his right hand.

In 1994, Burson-Marsteller executive Thomas J. Mosser was killed after opening a mail bomb sent to his home in New Jersey. In a letter to The New York Times, Kaczynski wrote he had sent the bomb because of Mosser's work repairing the public image of Exxon after the Exxon Valdez oil spill. This was followed by the 1995 murder of Gilbert Brent Murray, president of the timber industry lobbying group California Forestry Association, by a mail bomb addressed to previous president William Dennison, who had retired. Geneticist Phillip Sharp at the Massachusetts Institute of Technology received a threatening letter shortly afterwards.

Manifesto 

In 1995, Kaczynski mailed several letters to media outlets outlining his goals and demanding a major newspaper print his 35,000-word essay Industrial Society and Its Future (dubbed the "Unabomber manifesto" by the FBI) verbatim. He stated he would "desist from terrorism" if this demand was met. There was controversy as to whether the essay should be published, but Attorney General Janet Reno and FBI Director Louis Freeh recommended its publication out of concern for public safety and in the hope that a reader could identify the author. Bob Guccione of Penthouse volunteered to publish it. Kaczynski replied Penthouse was less "respectable" than The New York Times and The Washington Post, and said that, "to increase our chances of getting our stuff published in some 'respectable' periodical", he would "reserve the right to plant one (and only one) bomb intended to kill, after our manuscript has been published" if Penthouse published the document instead of The Times or The Post. The Washington Post published the essay on September 19, 1995.

Kaczynski used a typewriter to write his manuscript, capitalizing entire words for emphasis, in lieu of italics. He always referred to himself as either "we" or "FC" ("Freedom Club"), though there is no evidence that he worked with others. Donald Wayne Foster analyzed the writing at the request of Kaczynski's defense team in 1996 and noted that it contained irregular spelling and hyphenation, along with other linguistic idiosyncrasies. This led him to conclude that Kaczynski was its author.

Summary 
Industrial Society and Its Future begins with Kaczynski's assertion: "The Industrial Revolution and its consequences have been a disaster for the human race." He writes that technology has had a destabilizing effect on society, has made life unfulfilling, and has caused widespread psychological suffering. Kaczynski argues that most people spend their time engaged in useless pursuits because of technological advances; he calls these "surrogate activities", wherein people strive toward artificial goals, including scientific work, consumption of entertainment, political activism and following sports teams. He predicts that further technological advances will lead to extensive human genetic engineering, and that human beings will be adjusted to meet the needs of social systems, rather than vice versa. Kaczynski states that technological progress can be stopped, in contrast to the viewpoint of people who he says understand technology's negative effects yet passively accept technology as inevitable. He calls for a return to primitivist lifestyles. Kaczynski's critiques of civilization bear some similarities to anarcho-primitivism, but he rejected and criticized anarcho-primitivist views.

Kaczynski argues that the erosion of human freedom is a natural product of an industrial society because "the system has to regulate human behavior closely in order to function", and that reform of the system is impossible as drastic changes to it would not be implemented because of their disruption of the system. He states that the system has not yet fully achieved control over all human behavior and is in the midst of a struggle to gain that control. Kaczynski predicts that the system will break down if it cannot achieve significant control, and that it is likely this issue will be decided within the next 40 to 100 years. He states that the task of those who oppose industrial society is to promote stress within and upon the society and to propagate an anti-technology ideology, one that offers the "counter-ideal" of nature. Kaczynski goes on to say that a revolution will be possible only when industrial society is sufficiently unstable.

A significant portion of the document is dedicated to discussing left-wing politics, with Kaczynski attributing many of society's issues to leftists. He defines leftists as "mainly socialists, collectivists, 'politically correct' types, feminists, gay and disability activists, animal rights activists and the like". He believes that over-socialization and feelings of inferiority are primary drivers of leftism, and derides it as "one of the most widespread manifestations of the craziness of our world". Kaczynski adds that the type of movement he envisions must be anti-leftist and refrain from collaboration with leftists, as, in his view, "leftism is in the long run inconsistent with wild nature, with human freedom and with the elimination of modern technology". He also criticizes conservatives, describing them as "fools who whine about the decay of traditional values, yet... enthusiastically support technological progress and economic growth", things he argues have led to this decay.

Contemporary reception 
James Q. Wilson, in a 1998 New York Times Op-Ed, wrote: "If it is the work of a madman, then the writings of many political philosophers—Jean Jacques Rousseau, Tom Paine, Karl Marx—are scarcely more sane.""The Unabomber does not like socialization, technology, leftist political causes or conservative attitudes. Apart from his call for an (unspecified) revolution, his paper resembles something that a very good graduate student might have written."Alston Chase, a fellow alumnus of Harvard University wrote in 2000 for The Atlantic that "It is true that many believed Kaczynski was insane because they needed to believe it. But the truly disturbing aspect of Kaczynski and his ideas is not that they are so foreign but that they are so familiar." He argued that "We need to see Kaczynski as exceptional—madman or genius—because the alternative is so much more frightening."

Other works 
University of Michigan–Dearborn philosophy professor David Skrbina helped to compile Kaczynski's work into the 2010 anthology Technological Slavery, including the original manifesto, letters between Skrbina and Kaczynski, and other essays. Kaczynski updated his 1995 manifesto as Anti-Tech Revolution: Why and How to address advances in computers and the internet. He advocates practicing other types of protest and makes no mention of violence.

According to a 2021 study, Kaczynski's manifesto "is a synthesis of ideas from three well-known academics: French philosopher Jacques Ellul, British zoologist Desmond Morris, and American psychologist Martin Seligman."

Investigation 

Because of the material used to make the mail bombs, U.S. postal inspectors, who initially had responsibility for the case, labeled the suspect the "Junkyard Bomber". FBI Inspector Terry D. Turchie was appointed to run the UNABOM (University and Airline Bomber) investigation. In 1979, an FBI-led task force that included 125 agents from the FBI, the Bureau of Alcohol, Tobacco and Firearms (ATF), and the U.S. Postal Inspection Service was formed. The task force grew to more than 150 full-time personnel, but minute analysis of recovered components of the bombs and the investigation into the lives of the victims proved of little use in identifying the suspect, who built the bombs primarily from scrap materials available almost anywhere. Investigators later learned that the victims were chosen indiscriminately from library research.

In 1980, chief agent John Douglas, working with agents in the FBI's Behavioral Sciences Unit, issued a psychological profile of the unidentified bomber. It described the offender as a man with above-average intelligence and connections to academia. This profile was later refined to characterize the offender as a neo-Luddite holding an academic degree in the hard sciences, but this psychologically based profile was discarded in 1983. FBI analysts developed an alternative theory that concentrated on the physical evidence in recovered bomb fragments. In this rival profile, the suspect was characterized as a blue-collar airplane mechanic. The UNABOMB Task Force set up a toll-free telephone hotline to take calls related to the investigation, with a $1 million reward for anyone who could provide information leading to the Unabomber's capture.

Before the publication of Industrial Society and Its Future, Kaczynski's brother, David, was encouraged by his wife to follow up on suspicions that Ted was the Unabomber. David was dismissive at first, but he took the likelihood more seriously after reading the manifesto a week after it was published in September 1995. He searched through old family papers and found letters dating to the 1970s that Ted had sent to newspapers to protest the abuses of technology using phrasing similar to that in the manifesto.

Before the manifesto's publication, the FBI held many press conferences asking the public to help identify the Unabomber. They were convinced that the bomber was from the Chicago area where he began his bombings, had worked in or had some connection to Salt Lake City, and by the 1990s had some association with the San Francisco Bay Area. This geographical information and the wording in excerpts from the manifesto that were released before the entire text of the manifesto was published persuaded David's wife to urge him to read it.

After publication 
After the manifesto was published, the FBI received thousands of leads in response to its offer of a reward for information leading to the identification of the Unabomber. While the FBI reviewed new leads, Kaczynski's brother David hired private investigator Susan Swanson in Chicago to investigate Ted's activities discreetly. David later hired Washington, D.C. attorney Tony Bisceglie to organize the evidence acquired by Swanson and contact the FBI, given the presumed difficulty of attracting the FBI's attention. Kaczynski's family wanted to protect him from the danger of an FBI raid, such as those at Ruby Ridge or Waco, since they feared a violent outcome from any attempt by the FBI to contact Kaczynski.

In early 1996, an investigator working with Bisceglie contacted former FBI hostage negotiator and criminal profiler Clinton R. Van Zandt. Bisceglie asked him to compare the manifesto to typewritten copies of handwritten letters David had received from his brother. Van Zandt's initial analysis determined that there was better than a 60 percent chance that the same person had written the manifesto, which had been in public circulation for half a year. Van Zandt's second analytical team determined a higher likelihood. He recommended Bisceglie's client contact the FBI immediately.

In February 1996, Bisceglie gave a copy of the 1971 essay written by Ted Kaczynski to Molly Flynn at the FBI. She forwarded the essay to the San Francisco-based task force. FBI profiler James R. Fitzgerald recognized similarities in the writings using linguistic analysis and determined that the author of the essays and the manifesto was almost certainly the same person. Combined with facts gleaned from the bombings and Kaczynski's life, the analysis provided the basis for an affidavit signed by Terry Turchie, the head of the entire investigation, in support of the application for a search warrant.

David Kaczynski had tried to remain anonymous, but he was soon identified. Within a few days an FBI agent team was dispatched to interview David and his wife with their attorney in Washington, D.C. At this and subsequent meetings, David provided letters written by his brother in their original envelopes, allowing the FBI task force to use the postmark dates to add more detail to their timeline of Ted's activities. David developed a respectful relationship with behavioral analysis Special Agent Kathleen M. Puckett, whom he met many times in Washington, D.C., Texas, Chicago, and Schenectady, New York, over the nearly two months before the federal search warrant was served on Kaczynski's cabin.

David had once admired and emulated his older brother but had since left the survivalist lifestyle behind. He had received assurances from the FBI that he would remain anonymous and that his brother would not learn who had turned him in, but his identity was leaked to CBS News in early April 1996. CBS anchorman Dan Rather called FBI director Louis Freeh, who requested 24 hours before CBS broke the story on the evening news. The FBI scrambled to finish the search warrant and have it issued by a federal judge in Montana; afterwards, the FBI conducted an internal leak investigation, but the source of the leak was never identified.

FBI officials were not unanimous in identifying Ted as the author of the manifesto. The search warrant noted that several experts believed the manifesto had been written by another individual.

Arrest 

FBI agents arrested an unkempt Kaczynski at his cabin on April 3, 1996. A search revealed a cache of bomb components, 40,000 hand-written journal pages that included bomb-making experiments, descriptions of the Unabomber crimes and one live bomb. They also found what appeared to be the original typed manuscript of Industrial Society and Its Future. By this point, the Unabomber had been the target of the most expensive investigation in FBI history at the time. A 2000 report by the United States Commission on the Advancement of Federal Law Enforcement stated that the task force had spent over $50 million throughout the course of the investigation.

After his capture, theories emerged naming Kaczynski as the Zodiac Killer, who murdered five people in Northern California from 1968 to 1969. Among the links that raised suspicion was that Kaczynski lived in the San Francisco Bay Area from 1967 to 1969 (the same period that most of the Zodiac's confirmed killings occurred in California), that both individuals were highly intelligent with an interest in bombs and codes, and that both wrote letters to newspapers demanding the publication of their works with the threat of continued violence if the demand was not met. Additionally, Kaczynski's whereabouts could not be verified for all of the killings. Since the gun and knife murders committed by the Zodiac Killer differed from Kaczynski's bombings, authorities did not pursue him as a suspect. Robert Graysmith, author of the 1986 book Zodiac, said the similarities are "fascinating" but purely coincidental.

The early hunt for the Unabomber portrayed a perpetrator far different from the eventual suspect. Kaczynski consistently uses "we" and "our" throughout Industrial Society and Its Future. At one point in 1993 investigators sought an individual whose first name was "Nathan" because the name was imprinted on the envelope of a letter sent to the media. When authorities presented the case to the public, they denied that there was ever anyone other than Kaczynski involved in the crimes.

Guilty plea 

A federal grand jury indicted Kaczynski in June 1996 on ten counts of illegally transporting, mailing, and using bombs. Kaczynski's lawyers, headed by Montana federal public defenders Michael Donahoe and Judy Clarke, attempted to enter an insanity defense to avoid the death penalty, but Kaczynski rejected this strategy. On January 8, 1998, he asked to dismiss his lawyers and hire Tony Serra as his counsel; Serra had agreed not to use an insanity defense and instead promised to base a defense on Kaczynski's anti-technology views. After this request was unsuccessful, Kaczynski tried to kill himself on January 9. Sally Johnson, the psychiatrist who examined Kaczynski, concluded that he suffered from paranoid schizophrenia. Forensic psychiatrist Park Dietz said Kaczynski was not psychotic but had a schizoid or schizotypal personality disorder. In his 2010 book Technological Slavery, Kaczynski said that two prison psychologists who visited him frequently for four years told him they saw no indication that he suffered from paranoid schizophrenia and the diagnosis was "ridiculous" and a "political diagnosis". Some contemporary authors suggested that multiple people, most notably Kaczynski's brother and mother, purposely spread the image of Kaczynski as mentally ill with the aim to save him from execution.

On January 21, 1998, Kaczynski was declared competent to stand trial by federal prison psychiatrist Johnson, "despite the psychiatric diagnoses". As he was fit to stand trial, prosecutors sought the death penalty, but Kaczynski avoided that by pleading guilty to all charges on January 22, 1998, and accepting life imprisonment without the possibility of parole. He later tried to withdraw this plea, arguing it was involuntary as he had been coerced to plead guilty by the judge. Judge Garland Ellis Burrell Jr. denied his request, and the United States Court of Appeals for the Ninth Circuit upheld that decision.

In 2006, Burrell ordered that items from Kaczynski's cabin be sold at a "reasonably advertised Internet auction". Items considered to be bomb-making materials, such as diagrams and "recipes" for bombs, were excluded. The net proceeds went towards the $15 million in restitution Burrell had awarded Kaczynski's victims.
Kaczynski's correspondence and other personal papers were also auctioned. Burrell ordered the removal, before sale, of references in those documents to Kaczynski's victims; Kaczynski unsuccessfully challenged those redactions as a violation of his freedom of speech. The auction ran for two weeks in 2011, and raised over $232,000.

Incarceration 

Kaczynski is serving eight life sentences without the possibility of parole at ADX Florence, a supermax prison in Florence, Colorado. Early in his imprisonment, Kaczynski befriended Ramzi Yousef and Timothy McVeigh, the perpetrators of the 1993 World Trade Center bombing and the 1995 Oklahoma City bombing, respectively. The trio discussed religion and politics and formed a friendship which lasted until McVeigh's execution in 2001.

In October 2005, Kaczynski offered to donate two rare books to the Melville J. Herskovits Library of African Studies at Northwestern University's campus in Evanston, Illinois, the location of his first two attacks. The Library rejected the offer on the grounds that it already had copies of the works. The Labadie Collection, part of the University of Michigan's Special Collections Library, houses Kaczynski's correspondence with over 400 people since his arrest, including replies, legal documents, publications, and clippings. His writings are among the most popular selections in the University of Michigan's special collections. The identity of most correspondents will remain sealed until 2049. In 2012, Kaczynski responded to the Harvard Alumni Association's directory inquiry for the fiftieth reunion of the class of 1962; he listed his occupation as "prisoner" and his eight life sentences as "awards".

In 2011, it was reported that Kaczynski was a person of interest in the Chicago Tylenol murders. Kaczynski was willing to provide a DNA sample to the FBI, but later withheld it as a bargaining chip for his legal efforts against the FBI's private auction of his confiscated property.

The U.S. government seized Kaczynski's cabin, which they put on display at the Newseum in Washington, D.C., until late 2019, before it was transferred to a nearby FBI museum.

On December 14, 2021, 79-year-old Kaczynski was transferred from the supermax prison in Florence, Colorado, to the Federal Medical Center, Butner, North Carolina, for health reasons. Prison staff have not disclosed the precise reason for this transfer.

Legacy 
Kaczynski has been portrayed in and inspired multiple artistic works in the realm of popular culture. These include the 1996 television film Unabomber: The True Story, the 2011 play P.O. Box Unabomber, Manhunt: Unabomber, the 2017 season of the television series Manhunt and in 2021 the movie Ted K. The moniker "Unabomber" was also applied to the Italian Unabomber, a terrorist who conducted attacks similar to Kaczynski's in Italy from 1994 to 2006. Prior to the 1996 United States presidential election, a campaign called "Unabomber for President" was launched with the goal of electing Kaczynski as president through write-in votes. He was portrayed by Sharlto Copley in the 2021 film Ted K.

In his book The Age of Spiritual Machines (1999), futurist Ray Kurzweil quoted a passage from Kaczynski's manifesto Industrial Society and Its Future. In turn, Kaczynski was referenced by Bill Joy, co-founder of Sun Microsystems, in the 2000 Wired article "Why the Future Doesn't Need Us". Joy stated Kaczynski "is clearly a Luddite, but simply saying this does not dismiss his argument". Professor Jean-Marie Apostolidès has raised questions surrounding the ethics of spreading Kaczynski's views. Various radical movements and extremists have been influenced by Kaczynski. People inspired by Kaczynski's ideas show up in unexpected places, from nihilist, anarchist and eco-extremist movements to conservative intellectuals. Anders Behring Breivik, the perpetrator of the 2011 Norway attacks, published a manifesto which copied large portions from Industrial Society and Its Future, with certain terms substituted (e.g., replacing "leftists" with "cultural Marxists" and "multiculturalists").

Over twenty years after Kaczynski's imprisonment, his views have inspired an online community of primitivists and neo-Luddites. One explanation for the renewal of interest in his views is the television series Manhunt: Unabomber, which aired in 2017. Kaczynski is also frequently referred to by ecofascists online. Although some militant fascist and neo-Nazi groups idolize him, Kaczynski described fascism in his manifesto as a "kook ideology" and Nazism as "evil".

United States Attorney General Merrick Garland cited working on the Unabomber case as among the most important cases he worked on.

See also 
 Downshifting
 Green Scare
 Operation Backfire
 How to Blow Up a Pipeline
 Philosophy of technology
 Lewis Mumford
 The Question Concerning Technology

Published works

Mathematical 
  A proof of Wedderburn's little theorem in abstract algebra
  A challenge problem in abstract algebra
  Reprint and solution to "Advanced Problem 5210" (above)
 
 
  Kaczynski's doctoral dissertation. Complete dissertation available for purchase from ProQuest, with publication number 6717790.
  A brief paper in number theory concerning the digits of numbers
 
 
 
  A challenge problem in geometry
  Reprint and solutions to "Problem 787" (above)

Philosophical

Notes

References

Book sources

External links 

 Ted Kaczynski, britannica.com
 Kaczynski, Ted, encyclopedia.com
 Unabomber (Profile), The Canadian Encyclopedia
 Unabomber — FBI, fbi.gov
 Anarchist Library writings of Theodore Kaczynski

1942 births
20th-century American criminals
20th-century American mathematicians
Activists from Illinois
American anarchists
American environmentalists
American hermits
American male criminals
American people convicted of murder
American people imprisoned on charges of terrorism
American people of Polish descent
American prisoners sentenced to life imprisonment
Anarcho-primitivists
Bombers (people)
Complex analysts
Criminals from Chicago
Fugitives
Green anarchists
Harvard College alumni
Inmates of ADX Florence
Insurrectionary anarchists
Living people
Mathematicians from Illinois
Neo-Luddites
People convicted of murder by the United States federal government
People from Evergreen Park, Illinois
People from Lewis and Clark County, Montana
People with personality disorders
20th-century American philosophers
Prisoners sentenced to life imprisonment by the United States federal government
School bombings in the United States
Simple living advocates
University of California, Berkeley College of Letters and Science faculty
University of Michigan College of Literature, Science, and the Arts alumni
Violence and postal systems
Serial bombers